Detroit is a city in the U.S. state of Michigan.

Detroit may also refer to:

Other places
 Detroit, Alabama, U.S.
 Detroit, Illinois, U.S.
 Detroit, Kansas, U.S.
 Detroit, Maine, U.S.
 Detroit Township, Becker County, Minnesota, U.S.
 Detroit, Oregon, U.S.
 Detroit, Texas, U.S.
 Detroit Beach, Michigan, U.S.
 Detroit Harbor, Wisconsin, U.S.
 Detroit Harbor (bay)
 Detroit Island, Wisconsin, U.S.
 Detroit Lake, a reservoir in Oregon, U.S.
 Detroit Lakes, Minnesota, U.S.
 Detroit River, at the Canada-United States border
 Detroit Seamount, in the Pacific Ocean

Arts and entertainment

Film, television and theatre
 Detroit (film), a 2017 American period crime drama film 
 Detroit (play), by Lisa D'Amour, 2010
 Nathan Detroit, a fictional character in the musical Guys and Dolls

Gaming
 Detroit (video game), 1993
 Detroit: Become Human, a 2018 video game

Music

Groups
 Detroit (band), a rock group formed by Mitch Ryder
 Détroit, French musical duo of Bertrand Cantat and Pascal Humbert

Albums
 Detroit (mixtape), by Big Sean, 2012
 Detroit (Gerald Wilson album), 2009
Yusef Lateef's Detroit, 1969

Songs
 "Detroit", from the 1967 Disney musical film The Happiest Millionaire
 "Detroit" (song), by Whiteout from the 1995 album Bite It by Whiteout
 "Detroit", by Everclear from the 1997 album White Trash Hell 
 "Detroit", by Fireworks from the 2009 album All I Have to Offer Is My Own Confusion 
 "Detroit", by Mondo Generator from the 2003 album A Drug Problem That Never Existed 
 "Detroit '67", by Sam Roberts from the 2008 album Love at the End of the World 
 "Detroit", by Rancid from the 1993 album Rancid 
 "Detroit", by Gorillaz from the 2010 album The Fall

Automotive industry
 Detroit (Wheeler Manufacturing), an automobile, 1904
 Detroit Assembly, a General Motors assembly plant making Cadillacs
 Detroit Automobile Company, in Detroit 1905–1906
 Detroit Auto Vehicle Company, an early automobile manufacturer
 Detroit Cyclecar, a cyclecar 1913–1914
 Detroit Diesel, a manufacturer of engines
 Detroit Electric, an early automobile manufacturer
 Detroit Steam Motors Corporation, an early steam car manufacturer
 Detroit-Dearborn, an early automobile manufacturer
 Detroit-Oxford, an automobile 1905–1906
 Downing-Detroit, a cyclecar 1913–1915
 Abbott-Detroit, an automobile 1909–1919

Military
 HMS Detroit, the name of two British warships
 USS Detroit, the name of several US Navy ships
 Fort Detroit, on the north bank of the Detroit River 1701–1796
 Fort Shelby (Michigan), renamed Fort Detroit in 1805
 Mission Detroit, a part of the Normandy invasion in World War II

People
 Marcella Detroit, singer, musician and songwriter
 Mehmed Ali Pasha (1827–1878), born Ludwig Karl Friedrich Detroit

Sports
 Detroit Lions, National Football League
 Detroit Pistons, National Basketball Association
 Detroit Red Wings, National Hockey League
 Detroit Tigers, Major League Baseball
 Detroit Mercy Titans, the athletic program of the University of Detroit Mercy

Other uses 
 Detroit (horse) (1977–2001), a French racehorse

See also
 
 Big Three (automobile manufacturers)#United States, all three based in Detroit
 Strait (the French loanword appears in various English toponyms)
 Detroiters, an American TV comedy series